The 1993 Pittsburgh Pirates season was the 112th in franchise history; the 107th in the National League. This was their 24th season at Three Rivers Stadium. This season saw the three-time defending National League East champions fall to 5th place in the division with a 75–87 record. In the offseason, the National League expanded to 14 teams and Barry Bonds left the Pirates and signed with the San Francisco Giants. This season was the first of the Pirates record setting twenty straight losing seasons.

Offseason
 November 17, 1992: Alex Cole was drafted from the Pirates by the Colorado Rockies as the 17th pick in the 1992 MLB Expansion Draft.
 November 19, 1992: Roger Mason was released by the Pittsburgh Pirates.
 November 25, 1992: Gary Varsho was selected off waivers from the Pirates by the Cincinnati Reds.
 December 7, 1992: Dave Otto was drafted by the Pirates from the Cleveland Indians in the 1992 minor league draft.
 December 16, 1992: John Candelaria was signed as a free agent by the Pirates.
 January 27, 1993: Elmer Dessens was signed as an amateur free agent by the Pirates.

Regular season

Season standings

Game log

|- bgcolor="ccffcc"
| 1 || April 6 || Padres || 9–4 || Wakefield (1–0) || Benes || Candelaria (1) || 44,103 || 1–0
|- bgcolor="ccffcc"
| 2 || April 8 || Padres || 5–4 || Walk (1–0) || Harris || Belinda (1) || 15,828 || 2–0
|- bgcolor="ccffcc"
| 3 || April 9 || Giants || 6–5 || Minor (1–0) || Beck || Belinda (2) || 22,718 || 3–0
|- bgcolor="ffbbbb"
| 4 || April 10 || Giants || 5–12 || Burba || Cooke (0–1) || — || 18,264 || 3–1
|- bgcolor="ffbbbb"
| 5 || April 11 || Giants || 3–4 || Burkett || Wakefield (1–1) || Beck || 12,844 || 3–2
|- bgcolor="ccffcc"
| 6 || April 12 || @ Padres || 4–2 || Otto (1–0) || Harris || Belinda (3) || 46,192 || 4–2
|- bgcolor="ccffcc"
| 7 || April 13 || @ Padres || 6–4 || Walk (2–0) || Gomez || Wagner (1) || 11,493 || 5–2
|- bgcolor="ccffcc"
| 8 || April 14 || @ Padres || 11–7 || Minor (2–0) || Seminara || — || 13,053 || 6–2
|- bgcolor="ccffcc"
| 9 || April 15 || @ Padres || 5–4 (13) || Moeller (1–0) || Hernandez || Belinda (4) || 15,821 || 7–2
|- bgcolor="ffbbbb"
| 10 || April 16 || @ Dodgers || 4–7 || Hershiser || Wakefield (1–2) || Gott || 39,652 || 7–3
|- bgcolor="ffbbbb"
| 11 || April 17 || @ Dodgers || 3–6 || Martinez || Otto (1–1) || — || 46,034 || 7–4
|- bgcolor="ffbbbb"
| 12 || April 18 || @ Dodgers || 4–6 || Gross || Walk (2–1) || Wilson || 37,949 || 7–5
|- bgcolor="ffbbbb"
| 13 || April 20 || Reds || 0–5 || Belcher || Tomlin (0–1) || — || 9,074 || 7–6
|- bgcolor="ffbbbb"
| 14 || April 21 || Reds || 7–8 (12) || Foster || Candelaria (0–1) || — || 16,796 || 7–7
|- bgcolor="ccffcc"
| 15 || April 22 || Reds || 5–4 || Wakefield (2–2) || Smiley || — || 10,500 || 8–7
|- bgcolor="ffbbbb"
| 16 || April 23 || Astros || 2–4 || Swindell || Neagle (0–1) || Jones || 13,487 || 8–8
|- bgcolor="ffbbbb"
| 17 || April 24 || Astros || 4–8 || Hernandez || Candelaria (0–2) || — || 19,498 || 8–9
|- bgcolor="ccffcc"
| 18 || April 25 || Astros || 7–2 || Tomlin (1–1) || Portugal || — || 15,102 || 9–9
|- bgcolor="ccffcc"
| 19 || April 26 || @ Braves || 4–3 (11) || Minor (3–0) || McMichael || Belinda (5) || 47,324 || 10–9
|- bgcolor="ccffcc"
| 20 || April 27 || @ Braves || 6–2 (11) || Wakefield (3–2) || Stanton || Wagner (2) || 42,527 || 11–9
|- bgcolor="ffbbbb"
| 21 || April 28 || @ Reds || 2–4 || Pugh || Otto (1–2) || Reardon || 23,603 || 11–10
|- bgcolor="ffbbbb"
| 22 || April 30 || @ Astros || 2–11 || Portugal || Walk (2–2) || Hernandez || 31,867 || 11–11
|-

|- bgcolor="ffbbbb"
| 23 || May 1 || @ Astros || 3–7 || Drabek || Tomlin (1–2) || — || 39,242 || 11–12
|- bgcolor="ccffcc"
| 24 || May 2 || @ Astros || 6–2 || Cooke (1–1) || Swindell || — || 24,485 || 12–12
|- bgcolor="ffbbbb"
| 25 || May 4 || Braves || 2–3 || Glavine || Wakefield (3–3) || Stanton || 11,516 || 12–13
|- bgcolor="ccffcc"
| 26 || May 5 || Braves || 4–1 || Walk (3–2) || Maddux || Belinda (6) || 16,034 || 13–13
|- bgcolor="ffbbbb"
| 27 || May 7 || Expos || 0–1 || Nabholz || Tomlin (1–3) || Wetteland || 30,984 || 13–14
|- bgcolor="ccffcc"
| 28 || May 8 || Expos || 10–9 (10) || Belinda (1–0) || Bottenfield || — || 33,739 || 14–14
|- bgcolor="ccffcc"
| 29 || May 9 || Expos || 6–5 (11) || Minor (4–0) || Barnes || — || 17,714 || 15–14
|- bgcolor="ffbbbb"
| 30 || May 10 || @ Phillies || 1–5 || Jackson || Walk (3–3) || — || 29,712 || 15–15
|- bgcolor="ccffcc"
| 31 || May 11 || @ Phillies || 8–4 || Wagner (1–0) || Davis || — || 32,871 || 16–15
|- bgcolor="ffbbbb"
| 32 || May 12 || @ Phillies || 1–4 || Greene || Tomlin (1–4) || — || 24,906 || 16–16
|- bgcolor="ffbbbb"
| 33 || May 14 || @ Cubs || 2–3 || Harkey || Cooke (1–2) || Myers || 27,637 || 16–17
|- bgcolor="ffbbbb"
| 34 || May 15 || @ Cubs || 5–14 || Guzman || Wakefield (3–4) || — || 39,706 || 16–18
|- bgcolor="ccffcc"
| 35 || May 16 || @ Cubs || 5–3 || Walk (4–3) || Hibbard || Belinda (7) || 38,623 || 17–18
|- bgcolor="ccffcc"
| 36 || May 17 || @ Mets || 9–4 || Tomlin (2–4) || Gooden || — || 18,724 || 18–18
|- bgcolor="ccffcc"
| 37 || May 18 || @ Mets || 10–8 || Otto (2–2) || Schourek || Belinda (8) || 18,973 || 19–18
|- bgcolor="ffbbbb"
| 38 || May 19 || @ Mets || 4–6 (10) || Franco || Minor (4–1) || — || 19,112 || 19–19
|- bgcolor="ffbbbb"
| 39 || May 21 || Cardinals || 8–10 (11) || Lancaster || Wagner (1–1) || Perez || 22,800 || 19–20
|- bgcolor="ccffcc"
| 40 || May 22 || Cardinals || 4–2 || Walk (5–3) || Osborne || Belinda (9) || 26,012 || 20–20
|- bgcolor="ffbbbb"
| 41 || May 23 || Cardinals || 3–4 (10) || Smith || Minor (4–2) || Perez || 35,249 || 20–21
|- bgcolor="ccffcc"
| 42 || May 25 || Marlins || 2–0 || Cooke (2–2) || Hough || — || 14,595 || 21–21
|- bgcolor="ffbbbb"
| 43 || May 26 || Marlins || 4–5 || Hammond || Wagner (1–2) || Harvey || 23,267 || 21–22
|- bgcolor="ccffcc"
| 44 || May 27 || Marlins || 13–8 || Walk (6–3) || Bowen || — || 17,245 || 22–22
|- bgcolor="ffbbbb"
| 45 || May 28 || Dodgers || 2–7 || Astacio || Tomlin (2–5) || — || 18,532 || 22–23
|- bgcolor="ffbbbb"
| 46 || May 29 || Dodgers || 1–6 || Martinez || Otto (2–3) || — || 27,664 || 22–24
|- bgcolor="ccffcc"
| 47 || May 30 || Dodgers || 5–3 || Cooke (3–2) || Gross || Belinda (10) || 28,569 || 23–24
|- bgcolor="ffbbbb"
| 48 || May 31 || @ Rockies || 2–6 || Reynoso || Wakefield (3–5) || — || 47,665 || 23–25
|-

|- bgcolor="ccffcc"
| 49 || June 1 || @ Rockies || 8–6 || Walk (7–3) || Smith || — || 45,752 || 24–25
|- bgcolor="ccffcc"
| 50 || June 2 || @ Rockies || 5–3 || Petkovsek (1–0) || Parrett || Belinda (11) || 50,122 || 25–25
|- bgcolor="ccffcc"
| 51 || June 3 || @ Giants || 2–1 || Neagle (1–1) || Brummett || Minor (1) || 15,804 || 26–25
|- bgcolor="ccffcc"
| 52 || June 4 || @ Giants || 3–2 || Cooke (4–2) || Brantley || Belinda (12) || 15,725 || 27–25
|- bgcolor="ffbbbb"
| 53 || June 5 || @ Giants || 2–3 || Wilson || Wakefield (3–6) || Beck || 23,990 || 27–26
|- bgcolor="ffbbbb"
| 54 || June 6 || @ Giants || 1–7 || Swift || Walk (7–4) || — || 40,594 || 27–27
|- bgcolor="ffbbbb"
| 55 || June 8 || Rockies || 1–4 || Ruffin || Wagner (1–3) || Shepherd || 16,722 || 27–28
|- bgcolor="ccffcc"
| 56 || June 9 || Rockies || 4–1 || Neagle (2–1) || Blair || Belinda (13) || 30,625 || 28–28
|- bgcolor="ffbbbb"
| 57 || June 10 || @ Marlins || 3–4 || Turner || Otto (2–4) || Harvey || 34,091 || 28–29
|- bgcolor="ffbbbb"
| 58 || June 11 || @ Marlins || 3–11 || Aquino || Wakefield (3–7) || — || 42,835 || 28–30
|- bgcolor="ffbbbb"
| 59 || June 12 || @ Marlins || 2–5 || Hammond || Walk (7–5) || Harvey || 43,294 || 28–31
|- bgcolor="ffbbbb"
| 60 || June 13 || @ Marlins || 2–5 || Bowen || Minor (4–3) || Harvey || 42,945 || 28–32
|- bgcolor="ffbbbb"
| 61 || June 14 || @ Cardinals || 3–8 || Osborne || Neagle (2–2) || Perez || 26,683 || 28–33
|- bgcolor="ffbbbb"
| 62 || June 15 || @ Cardinals || 3–6 || Tewksbury || Cooke (4–3) || Smith || 36,084 || 28–34
|- bgcolor="ffbbbb"
| 63 || June 16 || @ Cardinals || 2–3 || Magrane || Smith (0–1) || Smith || 36,746 || 28–35
|- bgcolor="ccffcc"
| 64 || June 17 || Mets || 6–2 || Walk (8–5) || Gooden || — || 20,324 || 29–35
|- bgcolor="ccffcc"
| 65 || June 18 || Mets || 5–2 || Wagner (2–3) || Young || — || 21,521 || 30–35
|- bgcolor="ccffcc"
| 66 || June 19 || Mets || 8–3 || Toliver (1–0) || Tanana || Minor (2) || 24,199 || 31–35
|- bgcolor="ccffcc"
| 67 || June 20 || Mets || 3–2 || Belinda (2–0) || Saberhagen || — || 14,180 || 32–35
|- bgcolor="ffbbbb"
| 68 || June 21 || Cubs || 1–5 || Bautista || Smith (0–2) || — || 18,476 || 32–36
|- bgcolor="ccffcc"
| 69 || June 22 || Cubs || 7–2 || Walk (9–5) || Wendell || — || 22,773 || 33–36
|- bgcolor="ccffcc"
| 70 || June 23 || Cubs || 9–4 || Wagner (3–3) || Boskie || Belinda (14) || 16,423 || 34–36
|- bgcolor="ffbbbb"
| 71 || June 25 || Phillies || 6–8 || DeLeon || Candelaria (0–3) || Williams || 21,173 || 34–37
|- bgcolor="ccffcc"
| 72 || June 26 || Phillies || 4–2 || Cooke (5–3) || Schilling || — || 39,439 || 35–37
|- bgcolor="ccffcc"
| 73 || June 27 || Phillies || 4–3 (10) || Belinda (3–0) || Williams || — || 27,824 || 36–37
|- bgcolor="ccffcc"
| 74 || June 28 || @ Expos || 9–5 (10) || Wakefield (4–7) || Scott || — || 17,185 || 37–37
|- bgcolor="ffbbbb"
| 75 || June 29 || @ Expos || 2–9 || Nabholz || Wagner (3–4) || — || 14,023 || 37–38
|- bgcolor="ffbbbb"
| 76 || June 30 || @ Expos || 1–9 || Gardiner || Neagle (2–3) || Fassero || 15,734 || 37–39
|-

|- bgcolor="ffbbbb"
| 77 || July 1 || @ Expos || 5–7 || Rojas || Cooke (5–4) || Wetteland || 13,174 || 37–40
|- bgcolor="ccffcc"
| 78 || July 2 || @ Reds || 10–9 || Otto (3–4) || Ayala || Belinda (15) || — || 38–40
|- bgcolor="ffbbbb"
| 79 || July 2 || @ Reds || 1–9 || Pugh || Wakefield (4–8) || — || 32,681 || 38–41
|- bgcolor="ffbbbb"
| 80 || July 3 || @ Reds || 3–5 || Luebbers || Walk (9–6) || Dibble || 34,771 || 38–42
|- bgcolor="ffbbbb"
| 81 || July 4 || @ Reds || 2–7 || Browning || Wagner (3–5) || Spradlin || 28,046 || 38–43
|- bgcolor="ffbbbb"
| 82 || July 5 || @ Reds || 4–6 || Belcher || Neagle (2–4) || Dibble || 27,851 || 38–44
|- bgcolor="ccffcc"
| 83 || July 6 || @ Astros || 10–3 || Ballard (1–0) || Harnisch || — || 17,582 || 39–44
|- bgcolor="ccffcc"
| 84 || July 7 || @ Astros || 5–2 || Wagner (4–5) || Portugal || Belinda (16) || 24,682 || 40–44
|- bgcolor="ffbbbb"
| 85 || July 8 || @ Astros || 4–10 || Kile || Smith (0–3) || — || 19,999 || 40–45
|- bgcolor="ccffcc"
| 86 || July 9 || Reds || 4–1 || Walk (10–6) || Browning || Belinda (17) || 21,016 || 41–45
|- bgcolor="ffbbbb"
| 87 || July 10 || Reds || 7–10 || Service || Wagner (4–6) || Dibble || 30,805 || 41–46
|- bgcolor="ccffcc"
| 88 || July 11 || Reds || 3–2 || Minor (5–3) || Reardon || — || 22,772 || 42–46
|- bgcolor="ffbbbb"
| 89 || July 15 || @ Braves || 0–4 || Glavine || Tomlin (2–6) || — || 49,046 || 42–47
|- bgcolor="ffbbbb"
| 90 || July 16 || @ Braves || 2–3 || Maddux || Cooke (5–5) || Stanton || 48,539 || 42–48
|- bgcolor="ccffcc"
| 91 || July 17 || @ Braves || 4–3 || Wagner (5–6) || Smoltz || Belinda (18) || 48,665 || 43–48
|- bgcolor="ffbbbb"
| 92 || July 18 || @ Braves || 0–2 || Avery || Smith (0–4) || Stanton || 49,003 || 43–49
|- bgcolor="ffbbbb"
| 93 || July 19 || Astros || 2–4 || Harnisch || Walk (10–7) || Jones || 14,068 || 43–50
|- bgcolor="ccffcc"
| 94 || July 20 || Astros || 2–1 || Tomlin (3–6) || Drabek || — || 18,008 || 44–50
|- bgcolor="ffbbbb"
| 95 || July 21 || Astros || 3–5 || Kile || Cooke (5–6) || Jones || 28,227 || 44–51
|- bgcolor="ccffcc"
| 96 || July 22 || Braves || 8–7 || Minor (6–3) || Howell || — || 19,108 || 45–51
|- bgcolor="ffbbbb"
| 97 || July 23 || Braves || 2–6 || Avery || Belinda (3–1) || — || 37,506 || 45–52
|- bgcolor="ffbbbb"
| 98 || July 24 || Braves || 6–11 || Bedrosian || Walk (10–8) || — || 33,347 || 45–53
|- bgcolor="ffbbbb"
| 99 || July 25 || Braves || 1–13 || Glavine || Tomlin (3–7) || — || 29,386 || 45–54
|- bgcolor="ffbbbb"
| 100 || July 27 || Expos || 6–8 || Scott || Johnston (0–1) || Wetteland || 14,128 || 45–55
|- bgcolor="ccffcc"
| 101 || July 28 || Expos || 3–2 || Petkovsek (2–0) || Shaw || — || 13,470 || 46–55
|- bgcolor="ffbbbb"
| 102 || July 29 || Expos || 2–3 (11) || Wetteland || Minor (6–4) || Heredia || 18,823 || 46–56
|- bgcolor="ccffcc"
| 103 || July 30 || @ Phillies || 4–2 || Walk (11–8) || Rivera || Belinda (19) || 47,406 || 47–56
|- bgcolor="ffbbbb"
| 104 || July 31 || @ Phillies || 2–10 || Jackson || Tomlin (3–8) || — || 48,171 || 47–57
|-

|- bgcolor="ffbbbb"
| 105 || August 1 || @ Phillies || 4–5 || Mason || Cooke (5–7) || Williams || 46,693 || 47–58
|- bgcolor="ffbbbb"
| 106 || August 2 || @ Cubs || 10–12 || Scanlan || Minor (6–5) || Myers || 31,402 || 47–59
|- bgcolor="ccffcc"
| 107 || August 3 || @ Cubs || 7–3 || Smith (1–4) || Hibbard || — || 25,698 || 48–59
|- bgcolor="ccffcc"
| 108 || August 4 || @ Cubs || 6–5 || Ballard (2–0) || Boskie || Neagle (1) || 33,775 || 49–59
|- bgcolor="ccffcc"
| 109 || August 5 || @ Cubs || 5–2 || Tomlin (4–8) || Morgan || Dewey (1) || 31,639 || 50–59
|- bgcolor="ccffcc"
| 110 || August 7 || @ Mets || 2–1 || Cooke (6–7) || Gooden || Dewey (2) || — || 51–59
|- bgcolor="ffbbbb"
| 111 || August 7 || @ Mets || 8–10 || Maddux || Neagle (2–5) || Young || 27,904 || 51–60
|- bgcolor="ccffcc"
| 112 || August 8 || @ Mets || 3–2 || Smith (2–4) || Tanana || — || 27,231 || 52–60
|- bgcolor="ffbbbb"
| 113 || August 9 || Cardinals || 3–7 || Watson || Walk (11–9) || — || 16,465 || 52–61
|- bgcolor="ffbbbb"
| 114 || August 10 || Cardinals || 2–4 || Arocha || Johnston (0–2) || Smith || 12,531 || 52–62
|- bgcolor="ccffcc"
| 115 || August 11 || Cardinals || 8–6 || Dewey (1–0) || Burns || — || 35,288 || 53–62
|- bgcolor="ccffcc"
| 116 || August 12 || Cardinals || 5–4 (11) || Johnston (1–2) || Burns || — || 12,730 || 54–62
|- bgcolor="ccffcc"
| 117 || August 13 || Marlins || 8–3 || Smith (3–4) || Hough || — || 27,767 || 55–62
|- bgcolor="ffbbbb"
| 118 || August 14 || Marlins || 3–8 || Bowen || Walk (11–10) || Harvey || 29,003 || 55–63
|- bgcolor="ccffcc"
| 119 || August 15 || Marlins || 4–3 (11) || Minor (7–5) || Aquino || — || 22,665 || 56–63
|- bgcolor="ccffcc"
| 120 || August 17 || Giants || 10–3 || Cooke (7–7) || Burkett || — || 29,222 || 57–63
|- bgcolor="ffbbbb"
| 121 || August 18 || Giants || 6–9 || Wilson || Smith (3–5) || — || 23,314 || 57–64
|- bgcolor="ffbbbb"
| 122 || August 19 || Giants || 3–6 || Hickerson || Walk (11–11) || Beck || 20,151 || 57–65
|- bgcolor="ccffcc"
| 123 || August 20 || @ Padres || 7–6 || Petkovsek (3–0) || Davis || Dewey (3) || 17,888 || 58–65
|- bgcolor="ccffcc"
| 124 || August 22 || @ Padres || 10–5 || Cooke (8–7) || Benes || — || 10,492 || 59–65
|- bgcolor="ffbbbb"
| 125 || August 23 || @ Dodgers || 1–6 || Hershiser || Smith (3–6) || — || 38,739 || 59–66
|- bgcolor="ffbbbb"
| 126 || August 24 || @ Dodgers || 4–13 || Gross || Walk (11–12) || — || 36,133 || 59–67
|- bgcolor="ccffcc"
| 127 || August 25 || @ Dodgers || 2–1 (12) || Neagle (3–5) || Gott || — || 33,914 || 60–67
|- bgcolor="ffbbbb"
| 128 || August 27 || Padres || 6–10 || Benes || Cooke (8–8) || Hoffman || 21,048 || 60–68
|- bgcolor="ffbbbb"
| 129 || August 28 || Padres || 3–5 || Sanders || Smith (3–7) || Harris || 28,972 || 60–69
|- bgcolor="ccffcc"
| 130 || August 29 || Padres || 7–4 || Walk (12–12) || Ashby || Dewey (4) || — || 61–69
|- bgcolor="ffbbbb"
| 131 || August 29 || Padres || 0–11 || Brocail || Hope (0–1) || — || 21,636 || 61–70
|- bgcolor="ccffcc"
| 132 || August 31 || Dodgers || 6–2 || Johnston (2–2) || Gross || — || 16,291 || 62–70
|-

|- bgcolor="ccffcc"
| 133 || September 1 || Dodgers || 5–1 || Cooke (9–8) || Candiotti || — || 20,778 || 63–70
|- bgcolor="ffbbbb"
| 134 || September 2 || Dodgers || 0–4 || Astacio || Ballard (2–1) || — || 14,165 || 63–71
|- bgcolor="ffbbbb"
| 135 || September 3 || @ Rockies || 6–7 || Holmes || Dewey (1–1) || — || 51,512 || 63–72
|- bgcolor="ffbbbb"
| 136 || September 4 || @ Rockies || 4–10 || Painter || Wakefield (4–9) || — || 56,113 || 63–73
|- bgcolor="ffbbbb"
| 137 || September 5 || @ Rockies || 1–4 || Ruffin || Walk (12–13) || Holmes || 54,034 || 63–74
|- bgcolor="ffbbbb"
| 138 || September 6 || @ Giants || 1–4 || Sanderson || Wagner (5–7) || Beck || 25,276 || 63–75
|- bgcolor="ccffcc"
| 139 || September 7 || @ Giants || 4–3 || Menendez (1–0) || Jackson || Dewey (5) || 17,314 || 64–75
|- bgcolor="ffbbbb"
| 140 || September 9 || Rockies || 7–10 (12) || Wayne || Johnston (2–3) || — || 10,016 || 64–76
|- bgcolor="ffbbbb"
| 141 || September 10 || Rockies || 8–9 (11) || Moore || Minor (7–6) || Holmes || 15,335 || 64–77
|- bgcolor="ffbbbb"
| 142 || September 11 || Rockies || 2–3 || Bottenfield || Wakefield (4–10) || Ruffin || 21,649 || 64–78
|- bgcolor="ccffcc"
| 143 || September 12 || Rockies || 4–3 || Menendez (2–0) || Munoz || — || 21,032 || 65–78
|- bgcolor="ccffcc"
| 144 || September 14 || @ Marlins || 1–0 (6) || Wagner (6–7) || Hammond || — || 28,497 || 66–78
|- bgcolor="ccffcc"
| 145 || September 15 || @ Marlins || 8–1 || Cooke (10–8) || Hough || — || 28,788 || 67–78
|- bgcolor="ccffcc"
| 146 || September 16 || @ Marlins || 10–0 || Ballard (3–1) || Weathers || — || 26,730 || 68–78
|- bgcolor="ccffcc"
| 147 || September 17 || @ Cardinals || 2–1 || Minor (8–6) || Urbani || Dewey (6) || 28,625 || 69–78
|- bgcolor="ffbbbb"
| 148 || September 18 || @ Cardinals || 1–8 || Cormier || Wakefield (4–11) || — || 32,268 || 69–79
|- bgcolor="ffbbbb"
| 149 || September 19 || @ Cardinals || 6–7 || Perez || Dewey (1–2) || — || 31,631 || 69–80
|- bgcolor="ccffcc"
| 150 || September 20 || Mets || 6–2 || Wagner (7–7) || Hillman || Johnston (1) || 9,069 || 70–80
|- bgcolor="ffbbbb"
| 151 || September 21 || Mets || 3–4 || Telgheder || Cooke (10–9) || Maddux || 9,263 || 70–81
|- bgcolor="ffbbbb"
| 152 || September 22 || Mets || 5–6 (10) || Franco || Johnston (2–4) || — || 10,031 || 70–82
|- bgcolor="ffbbbb"
| 153 || September 24 || Cubs || 3–8 || Hibbard || Walk (12–14) || Bullinger || 16,312 || 70–83
|- bgcolor="ccffcc"
| 154 || September 26 || Cubs || 5–1 || Wagner (8–7) || Trachsel || — || — || 71–83
|- bgcolor="ccffcc"
| 155 || September 26 || Cubs || 1–0 || Wakefield (5–11) || Morgan || — || 26,872 || 72–83
|- bgcolor="ffbbbb"
| 156 || September 27 || Phillies || 4–6 || Rivera || Cooke (10–10) || Williams || 15,847 || 72–84
|- bgcolor="ffbbbb"
| 157 || September 28 || Phillies || 7–10 || Thigpen || Robertson (0–1) || — || 17,386 || 72–85
|- bgcolor="ccffcc"
| 158 || September 29 || Phillies || 9–1 || Walk (13–14) || Foster || Johnston (2) || 21,159 || 73–85
|- bgcolor="ccffcc"
| 159 || September 30 || Phillies || 5–0 || Wakefield (6–11) || Greene || — || 10,448 || 74–85
|-

|- bgcolor="ffbbbb"
| 160 || October 1 || @ Expos || 3–6 || Heredia || Wagner (8–8) || Wetteland || 14,148 || 74–86
|- bgcolor="ccffcc"
| 161 || October 2 || @ Expos || 4–2 || Ballard (4–1) || Henry || Dewey (7) || 16,126 || 75–86
|- bgcolor="ffbbbb"
| 162 || October 3 || @ Expos || 1–3 || Boucher || Hope (0–2) || Wetteland || 26,277 || 75–87
|-

|-
| Legend:       = Win       = LossBold = Pirates team member

Record vs. opponents

Detailed records

Roster

Opening Day lineup

Player stats
Batting
Note: G = Games played; AB = At bats; H = Hits; Avg. = Batting average; HR = Home runs; RBI = Runs batted in

Pitching
Note: G = Games pitched; IP = Innings pitched; W = Wins; L = Losses; ERA = Earned run average; SO = Strikeouts

Awards and honors

1993 Major League Baseball All-Star Game
Jay Bell, SS, reserve
Andy Van Slyke, CF, reserve

Notable transactions
 April 11, 1993: Mike LaValliere was released by the Pirates.
 July 9, 1993: John Candelaria was released by the Pirates.
 July 31, 1993: Stan Belinda was traded by the Pirates to the Kansas City Royals for Jon Lieber and Dan Miceli.
 August 19, 1993: Dave Otto was released by the Pirates.

Farm system

References

External links
 1993 Pittsburgh Pirates at Baseball Reference
 1993 Pittsburgh Pirates at Baseball Almanac

Pittsburgh Pirates seasons
Pittsburgh Pirates Season, 1993
Pitts